Dry Fork is an unincorporated community located in Bland County, Virginia, United States.

Unincorporated communities in Bland County, Virginia
Unincorporated communities in Virginia